Burnt offering or holocaust is a Hellenic form of animal sacrifice in which the entire animal is completely consumed by fire.

Burnt offering or Burnt Offering(s) may also refer to:
Burnt offering (Judaism) or Korban Olah, a twice-daily animal sacrifice that was offered at the former temple in Jerusalem
Burnt Offering (novel) a 1929 novel by Jeanne Galzy
Burnt Offering (album), a 1991 album by Jimmy Lyons and Andrew Cyrille
Burnt Offering, a 2014 album by The Budos Band
Burnt Offerings (Marasco novel), a 1973 novel by Robert Marasco
Burnt Offerings (Hamilton novel), a 1998 novel by Laurell K. Hamilton
Burnt Offerings (film), a 1976 horror film starring Karen Black
Burnt Offerings (album), a 1995 album by Iced Earth, and its title song
"Burnt Offerings", a 1987 song by Testament from The Legacy
"Burnt Offerings" or "Set the World Afire", a 1988 song by Megadeth from So Far, So Good... So What!